The tufted duck or tufted pochard (Aythya fuligula) is a small diving duck with a population of close to one million birds, found in northern Eurasia. The scientific name is derived from Ancient Greek  aithuia, an unidentified seabird mentioned by authors including Hesychius and Aristotle, and Latin fuligo "soot" and gula "throat".

Description 
The adult male is all black except for white flanks and a blue-grey bill with gold-yellow eyes, along with a thin crest on the back of its head. It has an obvious head tuft that gives the species its name. The adult female is brown with paler flanks, and is more easily confused with other diving ducks. In particular, some have white around the bill base which resembles the scaup species, although the white is never as extensive as in those ducks. The females' call is a harsh, growling "karr", mostly given in flight. The males are mostly silent but they make whistles during courtship based on a simple "wit-oo".

The only ducks which are similar are the greater scaup and lesser scaup, but these species have no tuft and a different call.

The tufted duck is one of the species to which the Agreement on the Conservation of African-Eurasian Migratory Waterbirds (AEWA) applies.

Refer to the following table for measurements of the tufted duck:

Distribution 
The tufted duck breeds throughout temperate and northern Eurasia. It occasionally can be found as a winter visitor along both coasts of the United States and Canada. It is believed to have expanded its traditional range with the increased availability of open water due to gravel extraction, and the spread of freshwater mussels, a favourite food. These ducks are migratory in most of their range, and overwinter in the milder south and west of Europe, southern Asia and all year in the British Isles. One individual has been reported as far south as Melbourne, Australia. They form large flocks on open water in winter.

Habitat 
Their breeding habitat is close to marshes and lakes with plenty of vegetation to conceal the nest. They are also found on coastal lagoons, shorelines and sheltered ponds.

Food 
These birds feed mainly by diving, but they will sometimes upend from the surface. They eat molluscs, aquatic insects and some plants and sometimes feed at night.

Gallery

References

External links 

 Tufted Ducks video from Gallery of Living Nature.
 
 
 
 
 
 

tufted duck
tufted duck
Birds of Eurasia
Birds of Africa
tufted duck
Taxa named by Carl Linnaeus